The Flight Commander is a 1927 British silent war film directed by Maurice Elvey and starring Alan Cobham, Estelle Brody and John Stuart. It was made by British Gaumont at their Lime Grove Studios in Shepherd's Bush. The celebrated First World War pilot Alan Cobham appeared as himself. It is also known by the alternative title of With Cobham to the Cape.

The film focused on the bombardment of a Chinese town. It was built with great publicity in Hendon.

Cast
 Alan Cobham as himself
 Estelle Brody as Mary 
 John Stuart as John Massey 
 Humberston Wright as James Mortimer 
 Vesta Sylva as Babette 
 Alf Goddard as Tommy 
 John Longden as Ivan 
 Cyril McLaglen as Sammy 
 William Pardue as Pierre 
 A. Bromley Davenport as Philosopher 
 Edward O'Neill as Missionary

References

Bibliography
 Low, Rachael. History of the British Film, 1918-1929. George Allen & Unwin, 1971.
 Wood, Linda. British Films 1927-1939. British Film Institute, 1986.

External links

1927 films
1927 war films
British war films
1920s English-language films
Films directed by Maurice Elvey
British silent feature films
Films shot at Lime Grove Studios
British aviation films
British black-and-white films
Films produced by Victor Saville
Silent war films
1920s British films